Founded in 1888 Northern AFC is the oldest continually operating football club in the Southern Hemisphere. Based in North Dunedin, the club has 12 Senior teams playing in the Football South Federation region.  

The club also has a Junior football club with teams from 6th grade to Youth grade playing in the local Dunedin competitions. The club also hosts a Football South Regional Development League 'Hub Club' arrangement with Maori Hill JFC which has U14s and U15s squads. 

The club's Senior and Junior home grounds and clubrooms are at The Gardens Ground, North Dunedin.

Club history
Founded in 1888 Northern AFC is the oldest continually operating football club in the Southern Hemisphere.

In 1888 two football clubs called Northern and Southern were formed in Dunedin. The Northern club played in Brown’s paddock in North Dunedin.  The Southern club played at Tahuna Park in South Dunedin.

Before the formation of the Southern League competition in 1968, Northern was the winner of Dunedin’s top league 14 times (1927, 1948, 1949, 1950, 1951, 1952, 1953, 1954, 1956, 1958, 1959, 1960, 1961, 1962).

Fiercely proud of its history, Northern is one of the more successful teams in Dunedin with eight Chatham Cup Final appearances.  Two of the club's proudest moments were in 1959 and 1961, winning the Chatham Cup, as well as the National Rothman Cup in 1962. 

In response to low player numbers in 1972 the Senior club joined with Maori Hill FC in the interests of football in the Northern end of Dunedin, and so the North End United club was formed.  At the Junior level, both Maori Hill and Northern maintained their individual identities.

Then in 1991 it was agreed that the Senior club would revert back to its historic Northern AFC name.

In 2013 the club celebrated its 125th Jubilee, as part of the celebrations the Men’s Prem team played Green Island FC in the first club football match to be held at Dunedin's new Forsyth Barr Stadium.

For some time Northern’s teams have played in Black and White striped shirts, Black Shorts and Black socks as the home kit.  However in 2022 in recognition of changes that were being made within the club and to acknowledge the clubs long history, the ODT Mens Premiership team wore Black and White Hooped Shirts, White Shorts and Black Socks, and the away kit was Maroon and Gold Shirts, White Shorts, and Maroon Socks in recognition of the relationship with Maori Hill JFC.

The ODT Womens Premiership team kit for 2022 was all Black, with an all Dark Green away kit, again in recognition of the clubs women’s football history.

The other Senior and Junior teams at the club continue to wear Black and White striped shirts, Black Shorts and Black socks as the home kit.  With Orange and Black or Maroon colours as away kits.

Recent seasons
In 2005, 2006, and 2007, the Women's Prem team won the Dunedin women's league.

In 2008 and 2009, the club won the Hanlin Shield, which is awarded to the most successful club in Dunedin collecting points from the Junior teams to the Masters grades.  

Mens ODT Southern Premiership and Football South Fletcher Cup 

Following a number of seasons where the club achieved limited success, and in particular some heavy defeats in 2020, changes were made to the coaching and support staff ahead of the 2021 season.

This led new and younger players to join the club, alongside experienced players like National League and New Zealand Rep Goal Keeper Liam Little. Better preparation and hard work resulted in improved performances and results on the pitch. The Mens Prems ended the season winning 4 games and drawing 2 games, which included beating the 2020 reigning ODT Mens Southern Premiership winners Otago University AFC.

2022 has seen the performances and results continue to improve significantly.  Again new and young talented players joined the club.  The Mens Prems led the league for a long period in 2022, ending the season winning 9 games, drawing 4 games, and finishing 4th.

Womens ODT Southern Premiership 

2022 saw the Women's Prems team return to the ODT Women's Southern Premiership.  The young team faced a challenging season against opposition with much more experience.  The team finished 6th, and plans to continue to recruit young players and develop its team further into 2023.

North End United Youth Development League Squads 

Northern JAFC, Northern AFC, and Maori Hill JFC continued the partnership to create combined Youth teams to compete in the Football South Development League under the name of ‘North End United’. This ‘hub club’ model is supported by Football South and will form a pathway for footballers of both clubs towards Senior Football at Northern AFC.
The Football South Development League is the pinnacle Youth league in the Southern region and involve teams from Dunedin, South Canterbury, Central Otago/Lakes and Southland.

North End United have been very successful and have won this Development League in 2021 and 2022.

Players

Coaches and Officials

Awards

In 2022 Northern AFC were nominated for 7 awards at the Football South Senior Awards evening:

References

Association football clubs in Dunedin
Association football clubs established in 1888
1888 establishments in New Zealand